Salvage Mission is a 1981 role-playing game adventure published by Marischal Adventures for Traveller.

Plot summary
Salvage Mission is the third of Marishcal's folio adventures, and differs from its companions in that it is less concerned with combat than with searching and possible diplomatic complications.

Publication history
Salvage Mission was written by J. Andrew Keith, with art by William H. Keith Jr., and was published in 1981 by Marischal Adventures as a 4-page pamphlet; a second edition was published in 1987 by Seeker.

Reception
William A. Barton reviewed Salvage Mission in The Space Gamer No. 48. Barton commented that "Overall, Salvage Mission is a worthy companion to the other Marishcal Adventures. I look forward to more adventures in this series."

Reviews
Different Worlds #18 (Jan., 1982)

References

Role-playing game supplements introduced in 1981
Traveller (role-playing game) adventures